Bhai-Bhai is a 1956 Indian Hindi-language drama film directed by M. V. Raman for A. V. M. Productions. It had screenplay by Javar Seetharaman, with Hindi screen adaptation of the Tamil film Ratha Paasam directed by C.V. Sridhar. The music director was Madan Mohan, with dialogues and lyrics written by Rajendra Krishan. One of the popular songs from the film was "Ae Dil Mujhe Bata De", sung by Geeta Dutt, "in an unabrasive fast tempo". The song became one of Madan Mohan's earliest hits, and the music of the film in journalist-author Bharatan's words, went on to "conquer the box office".

The film starred Ashok Kumar, who played the lead role, and Kishore Kumar (real-life brothers) as the two brothers, with the film being referred to as one of Kishore Kumar's prominent films. The cast included Nirupa Roy, who played the role of Ashok Kumar's "homely" wife, while Shyama played the "seductress". The film co-starred Nimmi, Om Prakash, David, Daisy Irani, and Shivraj.

The story is of two brothers, with the younger brother running away from home at an early age. The older brother gets entangled with another woman, leaving his wife and child at home. This situation leads to the meeting of the brothers, with the older one mending his errant ways.

Plot 
A rich businessman, Dayashankar Kumar, who is a widower, lives with his two young sons Ashok and Raj. When he catches the younger boy Raj stealing money, he punishes him and threatens to cut off his fingers. A frightened Raj runs away from home. Years pass and the older brother Ashok, becomes the owner of his father's business and property, running Superior Motors, which also extends to Bombay. Ashok is married to Laxmi and is a caring and loving husband. They have a young son, Munna.

Ashok goes on business to Bombay to meet his branch manager Bulbul. He comes in contact with a young woman, Sangeeta and is soon involved in an affair with her, intending to marry her. On his return home, Laxmi finds him changed and is shocked when he decides to sell his entire business and move to Bombay. He tells her that he's leaving and gives Laxmi some money. Laxmi takes her son and follows her husband to Bombay, but both get lost in the big city.

Raj, the younger brother, now called Raja, had reached Bombay making his living as a pickpocket. He stays with a street dancer Rani and her mentor, Baba. Rani tries to get Raja to give up his thieving habits and is in love with him. Laxmi and Munna accidentally meet Raja who gives them shelter. With Raja's help, Laxmi finds Ashok, but is upset when she discovers him living with Sangeeta. Soon it's exposed that Sangeeta is the wife of Bulbul, who is a rogue and wanted to get money off Ashok. Laxmi and Munna are reunited with a repentant Ashok. Their joy is doubled when they find that Raja is Ashok's younger brother.

Cast 
 Ashok Kumar as Ashok Kumar
 Kishore Kumar as Raj Kumar / Raja
 Nimmi as Rani
 Nirupa Roy as Laxmi
 Om Prakash as Bulbul
 Shyama as Sangeeta
 David as Baba
 Daisy Irani as Munna
 Shivraj as Dayashankar Kumar

Soundtrack 
The music was composed by Madan Mohan, while the lyrics by Rajendra Krishan. The singers were Lata Mangeshkar, Kishore Kumar, Mohammed Rafi, Geeta Dutt and Asha Bhosle.

The film had total 12 songs, which included seven Lata Mangeshkar solos, a duet with Lata Mangeshkar and Kishore Kumar, a song by Kishore Kumar, a song by Mohammed Rafi, and a song by Asha Bhosle, and the  song, "Ae Dil Mujhe Bata De", sung by Geeta Dutt.

Song list

References

External links 
 

1956 films
Films scored by Madan Mohan
1956 drama films
1950s Hindi-language films
Hindi remakes of Tamil films
Indian drama films
Hindi-language drama films
Films directed by M. V. Raman
Indian black-and-white films